NGK (an abbreviation for Nandha Gopalan Kumaran) is a 2019 Indian Tamil-language political action film written and directed by Selvaraghavan. Suriya, Sai Pallavi, and Rakul Preet Singh play the lead roles while Devaraj, Ponvannan, Nizhalgal Ravi, and Rajkumar play pivotal roles. Yuvan Shankar Raja composed the music and Sivakumar Vijayan was the cinematographer. The film was produced by S. R. Prakashbabu and S. R. Prabhu of Dream Warrior Pictures. 

Pre-production and principal photography commenced in January 2018. The film was released on 31 May 2019 to a mixed reception from both critics and audience.

Plot 
Nandha Gopalan Kumaran is a social worker and do-gooder, specialized in organic farming. He has a huge support from the youngsters in his hometown Srivilliputhur who were inspired by him quitting his high-profile job for serving his country. He lives with his mother Viji; father Ramanan, a former military officer; and a possessive wife, Geetha Kumari, who is a major strength for him.

Kumaran happens to meet an old friend, Raja, the right hand man of the area MLA, while trying to solve the problem of a few youngsters. He gets a big shock upon finding that what he tried for a long time and failed was done by his friend through the area councillor in a single phone call. Meanwhile, a few shopkeepers, middlemen, and others who alarmed by Kumaran's organic farming give him an ultimatum and later attack the people and burn their farms using chemicals when he refuses to give up. In order to make things good, Aruna Giri, a native, asks Kumaran to meet the MLA, Pandiyan, who happens to be a ruthless narcissist. He agrees to help if Kumaran joins his political party, KMK, along with 500 others from his villages, to which he is forced to comply. Pandiyan ill-treats Kumaran and asks him to clean his toilet, buy biriyani, and even bring a sex worker. Though furious at first, he decides to use the situation to gain Pandiyan's trust and in the process do good for his village. He discovers that Raja is suffering from terminal cancer and will not live long.

Kumaran happens to meet Vanathi Thiagarajan, who was appointed by the party with a monthly income of 2 crore to help them win the upcoming elections. Impressed by Kumaran, she seeks his opinion soon starting an affair with him, much to his wife's suspicion. Kumaran asks Vanathi to select Kesavamoorthy, the Home Minister, as their target. Despite threats from Killivazhavan "Killi", the Chief Minister, he manages to expose the ill deeds of Kesavamoorthy and arrange a scripted revolt for their party's benefit. However, Raja makes Kumaran kill him so as to intensify the people's emotions for their party and make the latter an important figure. Kumaran is arrested and later admitted in the hospital. Killi is shocked to find that Kumaran has turned the tides against him and decides to kill him. Kumaran is soon confronted by goons in doctors' disguise, whom he single-handedly defeats with great difficulty. The next day, he puts up a show in the front of his villagers, gaining their trust. Pichai Muthu "Pichai", the leader of KMK, is alarmed by the popularity of Kumaran and also finds that Vanathi is helping him. He decides to nominate Kumaran as the candidate for the upcoming elections to the legislative assembly.

As his character became negative after being ill-treated by Pandiyan, Kumaran makes a plot to kill his own family to become the chief minister. The night when he is to address his villagers, as per his plan, goons arranged by him attacked them, and his wife is stabbed, but the goons could not kill her because Vanathi came to her rescue. However, the goons successfully kill his parents according to his plan. An angry Kumaran addresses the gathering with pretending to be with full vigour, causing them to attack and kill Pichai and his accomplices while a bomb already set by Kumaran inside an audio system of the caravan blasts. Vanathi decides to leave their relationship to Kumaran. Kumaran forms a new party, Makkal Munnetra Kazhakam, and wins the upcoming elections forming a coalition government. He reunites with his wife. Kumaran becomes the new chief minister and while in a channel interview mentions about strengthening his hold in the state.

Cast 

 Suriya as Nandha Gopalan Kumaran (N. G. K), a social worker, later Chief Minister of Tamil Nadu
 Sai Pallavi as Geetha Kumari, Kumaran's wife
 Rakul Preet Singh as Vanathi Thiyagarajan, Kumaran's love interest
 Devaraj as Killivazhavan, Former Chief Minister of Tamil Nadu
 Ponvannan as Pichai Muthu, President of KMK party
 Nizhalgal Ravi as Ramanan, Kumaran's father and retired army General 
 Uma Padmanabhan as Viji, Kumaran's mother
 Rajkumar as Raja, Kumaran's friend
 Ilavarasu as MLA Pandiyan, a ruthless narcissist
 Bala Singh as Aruna Giri
 Vela Ramamoorthy as Ramamoorthy, Pichai's accomplice
 Thalaivasal Vijay as Saghayam, Pichai's accomplice
 Gopi Kannadasan as Minister Kesavamoorthy
 Sathish as Killi's personal secretary
 Shanthi Mani as Srivilliputhur resident
 Kambam Meena Sellamuthu as Selvi
 Karthigai Selvan as News Anchor
 Muthazhagan as Kumaran's friend

Production 
Following the films Nenjam Marapathillai and Mannavan Vanthanadi, it was announced on 17 November 2016 that director Selvaraghavan would direct actor Suriya's 36th film, to be produced by S. R. Prabhu of Dream Warrior Pictures, and the film is expected to enter production in January 2018 and was touted to be a Diwali 2018 release. However, owing to shooting delays due to sickness of the director, the film's release was postponed to 31 May 2019.

Principal photography of the film commenced on 22 January 2018 with actress Sai Pallavi playing the female lead with Neeraja Kona as the costume designer for the film. and later Selva announced his collaboration with Yuvan Shankar Raja for music, and Sivakumar Vijayan for cinematography, while actress Rakul Preet Singh will reportedly play the second female lead. Jagapathi Babu was chosen to play the villain, but was subsequently replaced with Devaraj.

Soundtrack 

The film's score and soundtrack were composed by Yuvan Shankar Raja. Shreya Ghoshal, Sid Sriram, and Ranjith are part of the album.

Release 
NGK is the first Tamil movie to release in South Korea. The satellite rights were sold to Star Vijay and digital streaming rights were secured by Amazon Prime Video. Digital streaming rights of the Telugu version were secured by Aha Video IN.

The film released worldwide on 31 May 2019.

Critical reception 

Hindustan Times stated that "Despite all the hype, Suriya starrer NGK fails as a political thriller. NGK could have been darker but it is not. Also, the film lacks cohesiveness and it is evident in its writing". M Suganth of The Times of India gave 2 out of 5 stars stating, "NGK is a letdown and doesn't fulfill any of the promises it has on paper". Srinivasa Ramanujam of The Hindu called it an oddly put together mash up of a movie. He concluded by stating, "NGK is Suriya trying to deliver a Selvaraghavan-ish performance when the director himself is trying to deliver a Shankar/Murugadoss-ish film. The results aren't extremely pleasing". S. Subakeerthana of The Indian Express rated the film 2.5/5 and stated, "Works to some extent, elevated by Suriya's performance... NGK, on the whole isn't satisfying. Simply put, it is neither a Selvaraghavan nor a Suriya film". Behindwoods rated 2.25/5 and stated that "NGK becomes a usual political drama but is watchable for Suriya's performance." Firstpost rated 2.5/5 and stated that "NGK ends up becoming a compromise film which is neither massy nor classy." News18 rated 1.5/5 and stated that "We have seen this ever so often on screen."

DekhNews.com gave a positive review and stated that, "Tamil movie NGK is a good movie and we think that the makers are going to make more than enough bucks out of it. You all can watch NGK with your friends and family" and also gave the film a rating of 3.5/5.

Reappraisal
Just like the director's previous films Pudhupettai and Aayirathil Oruvan, the film initially received a mixed response from both critics as well as audience due to the complexity of the film. But due to social media, the film got more of a positive response especially from the audience.

The website Behindwoods.com even called it one of the best films by Selvaraghavan. Websites like SamayamTamil.com and Sify have decoded the film for movie-goers to understand the hints present in the film.

References

External links 
 

2010s Tamil-language films
2019 action films
2010s political films
Films directed by Selvaraghavan
Films scored by Yuvan Shankar Raja
Indian action films
Indian political films
Political action films
Reliance Entertainment films